Elaine Wulcko (born September 1959) was an English women's international cricketer.

She played three international matches for the England women's cricket team. Her Test match debut came in an innings defeat to Australia, a match in which she took her only Test wicket. She went wicketless in her two other appearances; another Test and a One Day International, both against Australia.

She played domestically for Sussex and East Anglia.

References

External links
 

1959 births
Date of birth missing (living people)
Living people
England women One Day International cricketers
England women Test cricketers
Sussex women cricketers
East Anglia women cricketers